General Motors India is the subsidiary of General Motors of the United States. The following are the pages related to the company in India:

General Motors India Private Limited, the subsidiary of General Motors in India
Opel India Private Limited, Opel in India
Chevrolet Sales India Private Limited, Chevrolet in India